Ludvig Noa Åberg (born 31 October 1999) is a Swedish amateur golfer. He rose to number one in the World Amateur Golf Ranking in September 2022, after becoming number one in the European Amateur Golf Ranking in April 2021. He was part of the Swedish team winning the 2019 European Amateur Team Championship and was runner-up at the 2021 European Amateur.

Early life
Åberg was born and grew up in Eslöv in the province of Skåne, Sweden. In 2007 he began playing golf at the local club, Eslöv Golf Club, which he has represented through his career.

Amateur career
Åberg had success already as a junior golfer and won the Swedish Teen Tour Order-of-Merit in 2016, and was awarded the Annika Sörenstam Trophy. He has represented Sweden on different levels since 2017. He was individual leader at the 2017 European Boys' Team Championship in La Manga, Spain and was part of the Swedish team winning the 2019 European Amateur Team Championship, held on home soil at Ljunghusen Golf Club.

He won the 2017 Fairhaven Trophy in England and finished third individually at the 2018 Toyota Junior Golf World Cup in Japan. He finished 7th at the Junior Players Championship at TPC Sawgrass, and made his European Tour debut at the 2018 Nordea Masters, where he finished tied 34th. In February 2019 he was runner-up at the African Amateur Stroke Play Championship.

Åberg was educated at the Swedish national upper secondary sports school  ("Riksidrottsgymnasium") in Helsingborg before joining Texas Tech in the fall of 2019 to play collegiate golf in the United States. He finished 2019 with a win at the Sun Bowl Marathon All-America Golf Classic, a 54-hole off-season event in El Paso, Texas, for the nation's top collegians.

In 2020, as the COVID-19 pandemic shut down college golf in the U.S, Åberg spent six months in Europe competing in the Nordic Golf League, where he won two events, earning him 4 OWGR points each. In December he represented the International Team at the 2020 Arnold Palmer Cup. He ended the year 569th on the Official World Golf Ranking.

In February 2021 Åberg won the Jones Cup Invitational at Sea Island, Georgia after an opening round of 62 and 6 straight birdies. The win earned him a start at the RSM Classic on the PGA Tour. In April he became the number one ranked amateur golfer in Europe, as tracked by the European Golf Association.

Åberg was runner-up at the 2021 European Amateur in France. He took the halfway lead with total of −16, the lowest 36-hole score to par ever recorded in the championship's history. He shot 29 and 32 for a second round score of 61 (−10), the lowest ever recorded on the Chateaux Course at Golf du Médoc (unofficial record as preferred lies were in place due to recent heavy rain). He ended the tournament in second place, two strokes behind Denmark's Christoffer Bring.

Åberg, the world's third-ranked amateur at the time, received a sponsor's exemption for the 2021 Butterfield Bermuda Championship on the PGA Tour, he was tied 10th after the first round and made the 36-hole cut.

In May 2022, Åberg was named the Ben Hogan Award winner, as the best college player in United States. He represented Sweden at the 2022 Eisenhower Trophy, were his team finished second, one shot behind Italy and Åberg tied 7th individually. Later in September he rose to number one in the World Amateur Golf Ranking.

Åberg was the top-ranked player in the PGA Tour University points standings at the end of 2022 fall season, which earned him a spot in the field at the Hero Dubai Desert Classic on the European Tour in January 2023. He shot an opening-round 65 in his Rolex Series debut to share the lead after the first round, but finished tied 70th among the 87 players who made the cut.

In February 2023, he won The Prestige for a third consecutive year. In March he received a sponsor exemption to the Arnold Palmer Invitational, a designated PGA Tour event. After two consecutive rounds of 70 he was tied for ninth place, and finished the tournament 2-under in tied 24th place.

Amateur wins
2016 Galvin Green Junior Open, Skandia Junior Open
2017 Fairhaven Trophy
2019 Sun Bowl All-America Golf
2021 Jones Cup Invitational, The Prestige, Thunderbird Collegiate
2022 The Prestige, Big 12 Men's Championship
2023 The Prestige

Source:

Professional wins (2)

Swedish Golf Tour wins (2)

Team appearances
Amateur
European Boys' Team Championship (representing Sweden): 2017
European Amateur Team Championship (representing Sweden): 2018, 2019 (winners), 2021
Junior Golf World Cup (representing Sweden): 2018 
Arnold Palmer Cup (representing the International Team): 2020 (winners), 2022 (winners)
Eisenhower Trophy (representing Sweden): 2022

Source:

References

External links

Swedish male golfers
Texas Tech Red Raiders men's golfers
Sportspeople from Skåne County
People from Eslöv Municipality
1999 births
Living people
21st-century Swedish people